Gardeners Green is a hamlet in Berkshire, England, and part of the civil parish of Wokingham Without (where in the 2011 Census the population was included). At the junction of Honey Hill and Redlake Lane is The Crooked Billet public house. To the east of the hamlet is the ford on Redlake Lane, so named because of the heavy iron staining in the water.

References

External links

Hamlets in Berkshire
Wokingham